Hear Me may refer to:

 Hear Me (film), a 2009 Taiwanese movie  
 "Hear Me" (song), a song by Imagine Dragons
 Hear Me (EP), an EP by Imagine Dragons
 "Hear Me", a song by Jeannie Ortega from No Place Like BKLYN
 "Hear Me", a song by Kelly Clarkson from Breakaway

See also